The Joseph Briggs House, also known as the Coventry Town Farm, is a historic house in Coventry, Rhode Island.  The main block of the house, a -story wood-frame structure, was built c. 1790 by Joseph Briggs, and the property was purchased from his heirs in 1851 by the town for use as a poor farm.  The town added a two-story ell to the rear of the house to provide additional housing space.  The property is one of the few such poor farms to remain relatively intact.  The farm was closed in the 1930s, after which the property fell into decline.  It has since been rehabilitated as a two-family residence.

The house was listed on the National Register of Historic Places in 1987.

See also
National Register of Historic Places listings in Kent County, Rhode Island

References

Houses completed in 1790
Houses on the National Register of Historic Places in Rhode Island
Houses in Kent County, Rhode Island
Buildings and structures in Coventry, Rhode Island
National Register of Historic Places in Kent County, Rhode Island